Sardar Vallabhbhai Patel Stadium is an Indian sports stadium located in Valsad, Gujarat. The stadium is one of the home grounds of the Gujarat cricket team which plays in the  Ranji Trophy,a domestic cricket tournament. The stadium is owned by Bulsar District Cricket Association, which is affiliated to Gujarat Cricket Association. The stadium comes under the aegis of the West Zone. The stadium is used for cricket matches only during Indian domestic season. It is not used for International cricket matches as of now.

External links
  Cricinfo Website - Ground Page

Cricket grounds in Gujarat
Valsad
1960 establishments in Gujarat
Sports venues completed in 1960
20th-century architecture in India